Karanlıkdere (formerly Asbuzu) is a belde (town) in Bor district of Niğde Province, Turkey. At  it is situated in Melendiz Mountain. The population of Karanlıkdere is 968 as of 2011. The settlement is probably 400 years old and was founded by seven families from the east. But its original population also included a Christian minority as well. In 1998 Karanlıkdere was declared a seat of township. Main economic activity of the town is sheep and cattle breeding. Carpet weaving and scrap trading are other activities.

References 

Towns in Turkey
Populated places in Niğde Province
Bor District, Niğde